Seo Jeong-min (born 5 January 1934) is a South Korean cinematographer, and has worked on over 130 films since 1959.

Partial filmography 
 The Marines Who Never Returned (1963)
 Wild Animals (1997)
 Birdcage Inn (1998)
 Whispering Corridors (1998)
 Address Unknown (2001)
 Wishing Stairs (2003)
 My Little Bride (2004)
 Wet Dreams 2 (2004)

Awards 
He won a Grand Bell Award for cinematography in 2001.

External links 
 Seo Jeong-min at the Korean Movie Database
 

1934 births
Living people
South Korean cinematographers